Vyskeř is a municipality and village in Semily District in the Liberec Region of the Czech Republic. It has about 400 inhabitants.

Administrative parts
Villages of Drahoňovice, Lažany, Mladostov, Poddoubí and Skalany are administrative parts of Vyskeř.

References

Villages in Semily District